The 2011–12 season was Klubi i Futbollit Tirana's 73rd competitive season, 73rd consecutive season in the Kategoria Superiore and 91st year in existence as a football club. Following the title win three seasons ago, KF Tirana added to their 23 titles to make it their record 24th title win.

Season overview
The 2011–12 season started very well for now a consolidated Tirana. They added another trophy to their wealth of honours, the 9th Supercup, by winning the final match against defending champions Skënderbeu Korçë in Korçë, with a single goal of Bekim Balaj.

White and Blues ended the league in the 3rd place, 5 points below crowned champions Skënderbeu Korçë, even though outstanding Spanish coach Julián Rubio had to re-create the squad twice, due to lack of players who left the club by late summer. Additionally, Tirana players and staff had to outface a temporary financial kink, caused from the latter club transformation to sh.a. which had negative influence in the limited number of quality players which approached from the market. At majority of the season coach Rubio had severe difficulties and wasn't able to even to create a proper official squad for a match! Nonetheless, despite all difficulties faced, Tirana finally ended the season in the best possible way earning 2 trophies out of 3, by also winning their 15th Cup trophy. Tirana won the final against their fierce rivals of last 2 seasons Skënderbeu Korçë, with Bekim Balaj becoming again the key scorer, netting the winning goal at 107' at extra-time, since regular time ended goalless draw.

KF Tirana played UEFA Europa League starting from second round against FC Spartak Trnava. Being eliminated by 1–3 in aggregate, after goalless home draw and 1–3 away loss. Tirana finished first half 1–0 ahead in scoreline but conceded 3 goals at second half, saying farewell to Europe after only 2 matches.

12 October 2011 was a key event for club's future. The Municipality Council voted with unanimous consent the transformation of KF Tirana status to a shareholders association. Since then, the club is originally named as KF Tirana Sh.A (Shoqëri Aksionere). Municipality of Tirana will initially hold 100% of shares, however any future private sponsors or donors approaches to share stock would always be welcome.

Coaching staff

Players

Italics players who left the team during the season.
Bold players who came in the team during the season.

Competitions

Albanian Supercup

Kategoria Superiore

League table

Results summary

Results by round

Matches

Albanian Cup

First round

Second round

Quarter-finals

Semi-finals

Final

UEFA Europa League

Second qualifying round

Notes

References

External links
Official website

KF Tirana seasons
Tirana
Tirana